Johnny Graham (8 January 1945 – 31 October 2018) was a Scottish footballer, who played for Strathclyde, Third Lanark, Dundee United, Falkirk, Hibernian and Ayr United. Graham also represented the Scottish Football League XI twice.

Graham was signed by Dundee United manager Jerry Kerr from Third Lanark on 10 June 1964 for a fee reported to be £6,000. He made his debut for the club in August 1964 in a 3-2 win against local rivals Dundee. He joined Falkirk in 1965, being bought by Hibernian in 1969 for £15,000.

References

1945 births
2018 deaths
Footballers from Glasgow
Scottish footballers
Association football midfielders
Third Lanark A.C. players
Dundee United F.C. players
Falkirk F.C. players
Hibernian F.C. players
Ayr United F.C. players
Scottish Football League players
Scottish Football League representative players